Air Vice Marshal ASM Fakhrul Islam, OSP, GUP, ndc, afwc, psc, GD (P)   is a Bangladesh Air Force officer and Incumbent Vice Chancellor of Bangabandhu Sheikh Mujibur Rahman Aviation and Aerospace University. Prior to Join here, he was Commandant of Bangabandhu Aeronautical Centre. He also served as Air Officer Commanding(AOC) at BAF Base Zahurul Haque, Patenga, Chattogram.

Career 
Islam was commissioned at Bangladesh Airforce in 1985 in General Duties (Pilot) branch. He was Commandant of Bangladesh Air Force Academy (BAFA) while he was Air Commodore. He also served as director of Air Operations, director of Welfare and Ceremony, director of Admin Coord, Provost Marshal of Bangladesh Air Force and Director General (Training) at Armed Forces Division. On October, 2022 he has been appointed as the new vice-chancellor of BSMRAAU.

References 

Bangladesh Air Force personnel
Bangladesh Air Force
Living people
Year of birth missing (living people)